Frampton is an English surname. Notable people with the surname include:

Adam Frampton (born 1980), American architect
Alan Frampton (born 1929), New Zealand agricultural economist
Andy Frampton (born 1979), English footballer
Billy Frampton (born 1996), Australian rules footballer
Bob Frampton (1929–2001), Canadian ice hockey player
Carl Frampton (born 1987) British professional boxer
Cherry Frampton (born 1987), British glamour model
Christabel Frampton (1863–1951), British painter
Dia Frampton (born 1987), American musician
Edward Reginald Frampton (1870–1923), English painter
Eric Frampton (born 1984), American football player
George Frampton (1860–1928), British sculptor
George T. Frampton (born 1944), American attorney
Hollis Frampton (1936–1984), American filmmaker
John Frampton (16th century), English merchant and translator
Jordan Frampton (born 1985), British speedway rider
Kenneth Frampton (born 1930), British architect
Lorna Frampton (1920–2009), English backstroke swimmer
Mia Rose Frampton (born 1996), American actress, daughter of Peter Frampton
Mary Frampton (1773–1846), English diarist and botanist
Mary Nogueras Frampton (1930–2006), American photographers
Mary Featherstonhaugh Frampton (1928–2014), British civil servant
Meredith Frampton (1894–1984), British painter
Owen Frampton (1919–2005), English art teacher
Paul Frampton (born 1943), British theoretical physicist
Peter Frampton (born 1950), British singer-songwriter
Peter Frampton (make-up artist), Makeup artist 
Robert Frampton (1622–1708), Bishop of Gloucester
Roger Frampton (1948–2000), Australian jazz pianist
Stephen Frampton (born 1969), Irish hurler
Tregonwell Frampton (1641–1727), English racehorse trainer
Tyron Frampton (born 1994), British rapper performing as Slowthai

English-language surnames